Abbreviated and contracted words are a common feature of Japanese. Long words are often contracted into shorter forms, which then become the predominant forms. For example, the University of Tokyo, in Japanese  becomes , and "remote control", becomes . Names are also contracted in this way. For example, Takuya Kimura, in Japanese Kimura Takuya, an entertainer, is referred to as Kimutaku.

The names of some very familiar companies are also contractions.

The contractions may be commonly used, or they may be specific to a particular group of people.

Patterns of contraction
Japanese words are spelled using characters that represent syllables (morae), rather than individual phonetic units (phonemes) as in the English alphabet. These characters are compiled into two syllabaries: hiragana and katakana. Japanese also makes extensive use of adopted Chinese characters, or kanji, which may be pronounced with one or more syllables.  Therefore, when a word or phrase is abbreviated, it does not take the form of initials, but the key characters of the original phrase, such that a new word is made, often recognizably derived from the original.  In contracted kanji words, the most common pattern of contraction is to take the first kanji of each word in a phrase and put them together as a portmanteau.  In the example from the lead, using , the Tō- of Tōkyō and the Dai- of Daigaku becomes , the common abbreviation for the University of Tokyo.

There are also instances in which alternative readings of a particular kanji are used in the contraction.

In loanwords and names, the most common pattern is to take the first two morae (or kana) of each of the two words, and combine them forming a new, single word. For example, "family restaurant" or famirī resutoran (ファミリーレストラン) becomes famiresu (ファミレス).

Yōon sounds, those sounds represented using a kana ending in i and a small ya, yu or yo  kana, such as kyo count as one mora. Japanese long vowels count as two morae, and may disappear (the same can be said for the sokuon, or small tsu っ); Harry Potter, originally Harī Pottā (ハリーポッター), is contracted to Haripota (ハリポタ), or otherwise be altered; actress Kyoko Fukada, Fukada Kyōko (深田恭子), becomes Fukakyon (ふかきょん).

These abbreviated names are so common in Japan that many companies initiate abbreviations of the names of their own products. For example, the animated series Pretty Cure (プリティキュア) marketed itself under the four-character abbreviated name purikyua (プリキュア).

Long kanji names

Loanwords

Three and four character loanwords

Abbreviations

Created words
Many abbreviations, especially four-character words, have been created for particular products or TV shows.

Contractions of names

Highways and railway lines
Many highways and railway lines have names that are contractions of the names of their endpoints. (Tokyu Toyoko Line) links Tokyo and  Yokohama, taking part of its name from each city.

Other examples include:

Sometimes names of this type preserve older place names.

Some other examples:

Single letters as abbreviations
Many single letters of the Latin alphabet have names that resemble the pronunciations of Japanese words or characters. Japanese people use them in contexts such as advertising to catch the reader's attention. Other uses of letters include abbreviations of spellings of words. Here are some examples:

E: /いい (ii; the word for "good" in Japanese). The letter appears in the name of the company e-homes.
J: The first letter of "Japan" (日本) as in J1 League, J-Phone.
Q: The kanji  きゅう ("nine") has the reading kyū. Japanese "Dial Q2" premium-rate telephone numbers start with 0990.
S, M: used for sadism and masochism respectively, often referring to mild personality traits rather than sexual fetishes. "SM" is also used for sadomasochism, instead of "S&M" used in English, in a more sexual context.
W: The English word "double." Japanese people sometimes pronounce the letter "double." ダブル For example, ”Wデート” (W deeto) means "double date(s)"; "WW Burger" from Freshness Burger has double beef and double cheese.

Longer Romaji abbreviations

Abbreviated and contracted words